Alfred William Maitland FitzRoy, 8th Duke of Grafton (3 March 1850 – 10 January 1930), styled Lord Alfred FitzRoy between 1882 and 1912 and Earl of Euston between 1912 and 1918, was the second son of Augustus FitzRoy, 7th Duke of Grafton and his wife Anna Balfour, daughter of James Balfour (-1845) and aunt of Arthur Balfour. His elder brother and heir to the dukedom Henry James FitzRoy, Earl of Euston died in 1912, before their father's death. He was a lieutenant in the Coldstream Guards, and deputy lieutenant for Suffolk

He married, firstly, Margaret Rose Smith (1855–1913), on 27 April 1875 and had three children:
 Lady Lillian Rose FitzRoy (1876–1960), married Charles Robertson; no issue.
 Lady Mary Margaret FitzRoy (1877–1966); died unmarried.
 William Henry Alfred FitzRoy, Viscount Ipswich (1884–1918); married Auriol Brougham and had issue. Son John FitzRoy, 9th Duke of Grafton, and two daughters: Margaret Jane, who married Maj. Gen. Sir John Nelson, and Mary-Rose. He fought in World War I and was killed in an aeroplane accident on 23 April 1918.

The 8th Duke married, secondly, Susanna Mary McTaggart-Stewart (1878–1961), on 8 January 1916 and had two daughters:

 Lady Elfrida Marie Susanna FitzRoy (1919–1920)
 Lady Cecilia Blanche Genevieve FitzRoy (1922–1974), married the life peer Lord Howard of Henderskelfe and had issue.

On 15 March 1920, he was appointed a deputy lieutenant of Suffolk.

The Duke died in 1930 and was succeeded by his grandson, John, Earl of Euston.

References

External links

108
Earls of Arlington
Grafton, Alfred FitzRoy, 8th Duke of
Grafton, Alfred FitzRoy, 8th Duke of
A
Alfred
Deputy Lieutenants of Suffolk